Robert "Scoop" Jackson (born November 23, 1963) is an American sports journalist, author and cultural critic currently contributing to ESPN.com.

Early life
Jackson was born and raised in Chicago, where he still lives with his wife Tracy and two sons; he was born the day after U.S. President John F. Kennedy was assassinated, and Jackson was named after his uncle joked, "This boy scooped Kennedy. Put him on the cover of the paper." He attended Luther High School South in Chicago, was educated at Xavier University (LA) and received a Master in Arts degree from Howard University where he made the National Dean's List in 1990-91 before becoming a journalist. His father was a writer for the Rocky Mountain News in Denver.

Career
Jackson began his career as a freelance writer. Appearing in various publications has including  USA Today, Washington Post, Chicago Tribune, The Source The Final Call.  Authoring two books, The Last Black Mecca and The Darkside. He has written for basketball and hip hop magazines for at least 25 years, executive editing  SLAM Magazine, XXL, and edited Hoop and Inside Stuff. He has also written for and Vibe and is a frequent guest on radio and TV sports talk shows, and is regularly featured on ESPN's Sports Century series. Jackson's first article for SLAM appeared in the January 1995 issue titled "The Large Professor", a story about Shaquille O'Neal. At one time, Jackson pushed SLAM publisher Dennis Page to put Allen Iverson on the cover of the magazine while Iverson was still playing basketball at Georgetown University, threatening to resign if this did not happen. In addition to his regular feature articles for SLAM, in 2004 Jackson began to write a back-page column named "Game Point", in which he aired opinions on various basketball-related topics. Jackson continued to write for SLAM until the July 2005 issue.

In 2000 Jackson was commissioned by Nike to pen the first book about the company's contribution to basketball and sneaker culture with Sole Provider: 30 Years of Nike Basketball. Where Jackson stayed on with the company for five years a content and copy writer before joining ESPN.

He began writing for ESPN.com on March 8, 2005 with his first article being a statement of his sporting views entitled "Scoop's Manifesto".  In 2006, upon his one-year anniversary with ESPN, he had a follow up article stating what he learned on the job.  The article ended with him saying that he believes he is continuing Ralph Wiley's legacy, and stated that "I hope that I am doing him justice." Consequently, this article led to a feud with now former ESPN.com columnist Jason Whitlock, who criticized Jackson in an interview and called him a "bojangler" for portraying himself as the next Ralph Wiley.  This led to Whitlock's firing from ESPN.

While writing for ESPN he often campaigns against injustices against blacks in America.  In a Jan 10th 2008 article entitled "Time for Tiger to roar," Jackson called for golfer Tiger Woods to show outrage over a comment a friend and golf announcer made during one of Tigers matches.  He also wrote an article entitled "The Willingham Question" in which he claims that Notre Dame exhibited racism in the firing of then head football coach Tyrone Willingham.

During the 2008 World Series, Jackson found himself surrounded by controversy after writing a column about Tampa Bay Rays star B.J. Upton.  Jackson argued that Upton (who is African-American) can be a role model to the black community because of his "propensity to be lazy".  One writer for a Rays blog later said, "Could you imagine Scoop Jackson's reaction if Peter Gammons had written that paragraph? ... Good lord Scoop. We don't mean to yell, but did you eat paint chips when you were a kid? Of all the positive things Upton does on the baseball field that are worthy of emulating, Jackson picks laziness as why inner-city kids will gravitate to the Rays center fielder." His first contribution to ESPN The Magazine appeared in the May 8, 2006 issue titled "It's Time" which was a short article explaining why he was picking the New Jersey Nets to win the 2005-06 NBA championship. Having grown up with Tim Hardaway, he interviewed him for a column that appeared on ESPN.com on February 23, 2007, about Hardaway's comment, "I hate gay people."

In 2015 Jackson transferred from senior writer at ESPN.com to senior writer at Sportscenter for ESPN. He also returned to copyright for Nike. Helping develop their EQUALITY campaigns. In 2017 he won the New York International Television & Film gold medal award for Sports Coverage for his ESPN feature on the anticipation of the Chicago Cubs winning the World Series.

Personal
Jackson is a fan of the Chicago White Sox and the New York Knicks. He is a founding member of The Music Snobs podcast.

References

1963 births
Living people
African-American sports journalists
American sports journalists
Sportswriters from Illinois
Writers from Chicago
ESPN.com
Howard University alumni